Pataz District is one of thirteen districts of the province Pataz in Peru.

References